Carlotta Giovannini (born 5 July 1990) is an Italian artistic gymnast who competed at her first international competition in 2003.

Career
Giovannini has had considerable success at the European Level. She was a member of the historic Gold Medal winning Italian team at the 2006 European Championships in Volos, Greece. She followed this success by winning an individual Gold in the Vault Final at the 2007 European Championships in Amsterdam, Netherlands as well as a silver in the 2008 European Vault Final.

Giovannini competed at the 2008 Beijing Olympics as a member of the Italian Olympic Team. Whilst the Italian team failed to progress to the final due to a number of mistakes in qualifications, Giovannini progressed to the individual Vault Final, where she placed sixth.

Eponymous skill
Giovanni has one eponymous uneven bars dismount listed in the Code of Points.

References

External links
 

1990 births
Living people
Italian female artistic gymnasts
Gymnasts at the 2008 Summer Olympics
Olympic gymnasts of Italy
Originators of elements in artistic gymnastics
European champions in gymnastics
21st-century Italian women